Karan Patel (born 23 November 1983) is an Indian actor and host on Hindi television. Patel performed the main lead Raman Bhalla in the soap opera Yeh Hai Mohabbatein and played the role of Rishabh Bajaj in Kasautii Zindagii Kay 2.   He also participated in the reality shows Nach Baliye 3, Jhalak Dikhhla Jaa 6 and Fear Factor: Khatron Ke Khiladi 10.

Early life 
Patel is a Gujarati who was born in Kolkata on 23 November 1983. His father's name is Rashesh Patel. He has also attended Shiamak Davar's dance classes.

Career 
Patel starred in the Star Plus series Kasturi, where he played Robbie Sabarwal, his first lead role. Previously, he played a number of roles in Balaji Telefilms. His first role was in Kahaani Ghar Ghar Kii where he played Vigyat. He has also worked in Kasautii Zindagii Kay and Kasamh Se.

In 2008 he debuted as host by anchoring a new show Kaho Na Yaar Hai. In 2013, he participated in Jhalak Dikhhla Jaa. He played the role of Raman Bhalla in Yeh Hai Mohabbatein From 2013 to 2019.  He quit the show in July 2019. But re entered in November 2019.   His role as Raman Kumar Omprakash Bhalla with his co-star Divyanka T Dahiya earned him Zee Gold Awards for Best Actor (Popular) three years in a row (2014–16), the Indian Television Academy Award 2015 for Best Romantic Actor (Male), and the Indian Telly Award for Best Actor in a Lead Role.In 2020 He participated in Fear Factor: Khatron Ke Khiladi 10. The same year he played the role of Rishabh Bajaj in Kasautii Zindagii Kay Where he replaced Karan Singh Grover.

Filmography

Films

Television

Awards

Personal life 

Patel married Ankita Bhargava Patel on 3 May 2015 in Mumbai. Their first child was born on 14 December 2019.

See also 
 List of Indian television actors

References

External links 

 
 

21st-century Indian male actors
1983 births
Indian male film actors
Indian male television actors
Living people
Male actors from Kolkata
Actors from Mumbai
Fear Factor: Khatron Ke Khiladi participants